RGD may refer to:

RGD, the abbreviation for Arginylglycylaspartic acid
RGD-5, a Soviet/Russian hand grenade
RGD-33, a Soviet World War II-era hand grenade
The Association of Registered Graphic Designers of Ontario or the related professional designation of Registered Graphic Designer
Rat genome database, a collection of genetic and genomic information about the rat
The Reacting Gas Dynamics Laboratory at the Massachusetts Institute of Technology
Registrar General Department, a government agency responsible for civil registration in many Commonwealth countries
Radio Glas Drine, group of local commercial radio stations in Bosnia and Herzegovina